My Lucky Star is a 1933 British comedy film directed by Louis Blattner and John Harlow and starring Florence Desmond, Oscar Asche and Harry Tate. It was made at Elstree Studios as a quota quickie. A young woman working in a shop poses as a film star.

Cast
 Florence Desmond as Mlle. de Capo  
 Oscar Asche as President of Film Company  
 Charlie Naughton as House Painter  
 Jimmy Gold as House Painter  
 Harry Tate as Film Director Monty  
 Harold Huth as Hero  
 Carol Coombe as Lucette  
 Reginald Purdell as Artist  
 Herman Darewski as Conductor  
 George Baker as Foreman Painter  
 Henry B. Longhurst as Dudley Collins 
 Alfred Atkins as Studio Commissionaire  
 Ernest Jay as Press Agent  
 Della Rega as Mlle. de Capo's Dresser

References

Bibliography
 Chibnall, Steve. Quota Quickies: The Birth of the British 'B' Film. British Film Institute, 2007.
 Low, Rachael. Filmmaking in 1930s Britain. George Allen & Unwin, 1985.
 Wood, Linda. British Films, 1927-1939. British Film Institute, 1986.

External links
 

1933 films
British comedy films
1933 comedy films
Films shot at Rock Studios
Quota quickies
Films set in London
Films about filmmaking
Films directed by John Harlow
British black-and-white films
1930s English-language films
1930s British films